Us is a 2019 American horror film written and directed by Jordan Peele, starring Lupita Nyong'o, Winston Duke, Shahadi Wright Joseph, Evan Alex, Elisabeth Moss, and Tim Heidecker. The film follows Adelaide Wilson (Nyong'o) and her family, who are attacked by a group of menacing doppelgängers.

The film had its world premiere at South by Southwest on March 8, 2019, and was theatrically released in the United States on March 22, 2019, by Universal Pictures. It was later released on 4K UHD Blu-ray, Blu-ray and DVD on June 18. Us was a commercial success, grossing $255.1 million worldwide against a budget of $20 million and received praise for Nyong'o's dual role performance and Michael Abels' musical score.

Us was nominated for one Art Directors Guild, eleven Black Reel Awards (winning four), four Critics' Choice Movie Awards, nine Golden Trailer Awards (winning five), one Make-Up Artists and Hair Stylists Guild, three MTV Movie & TV Awards, eight NAACP Image Awards (winning two), four People's Choice Awards, seven Saturn Awards (winning one), one Screen Actors Guild Award, and one World Soundtrack Awards (won).

Accolades

References

External links 
 

Lists of accolades by film